Give Thankx is the twelfth album by Jimmy Cliff.

Track listing
All tracks written by Jimmy Cliff; except where indicated

"Bongo Man" – 5:03
"Stand Up and Fight Back" – 3:16 (Rebop Kwaku Baah)
"She Is a Woman" – 4:08
"You Left Me Standing by the Door" – 3:21
"Footprints" – 3:57
"Meeting in Afrika" 3:37
"Wanted Man" – 3:41 (Leonard Smith)
"Lonely Streets" – 4:21
"Love I Need" – 3:36
"Universal Love (Beyond the Boundaries)" – 4:10

Personnel
Jimmy Cliff - vocals
Earl "Chinna" Smith, Ernest Ranglin - lead and rhythm guitar
Leonard Smith - rhythm guitar, percussion
Leebert "Gibby" Morrison - bass
Paul "Pablo" Smith - keyboards
Ansel Collins, Keith Sterling, Leslie Butler - additional keyboards
Ronald "Ronnie" Murphy - drums
Rebop Kwaku Baah - congas, percussion
Uziah "Sticky" Thompson - percussion
Babi Floyd, Cheryl Lynn, Debby, Diema, Janice Pendarvis, Ken Williams, Pam - backing vocals
The Meditations - backing vocals on "Bongo Man"
Ras Michael and the Sons of Negus - Nyabinghi drums on "Bongo Man"
Dave Wolfert, Steve Lukather - electric guitar on "You Left Me Standing By the Door"
Will Lee - bass on "You Left Me Standing By the Door"
Neil Larsen - piano on "You Left Me Standing By the Door"
Jay Winding - organ on "You Left Me Standing By the Door"
Jim Keltner - drums on "You Left Me Standing By the Door"
Technical
Engineer – Boris Gardner, Mervyn Williams
Assistant engineers – Jay Krugman, Julie Last, Steve Fontano
Mastered By – Jo Hansch
Mixed By & Recorded By – John Stronach
Bob Himmel - artwork
Photography – Ruiko Yoshida
"You Left Me Standing by the Door"
Recorded at Cherokee Recording Studios, Hollywood

References 

1978 albums
Jimmy Cliff albums
Albums produced by Bob Johnston
Warner Records albums